The pipa is a plucked Chinese string instrument.

Pipa or PIPA may also refer to:

Legislation 
 Personal Information Protection Act, part of Canadian privacy law
 PROTECT IP Act, a proposed American law

People
 Bhagat Pipa (1424–1500s), a prince from Rajasthan, India
 Jean-Pierre Dikongué Pipa (born 1940), a Cameroonian film director and writer
 Alexander Pipa (born 1983), a German rugby union player
 Pipa (footballer) (born 1998), Spanish footballer
 Pipa Jing, a character in the Chinese novel Fengshen Yanyi

Places
Pipa, Gansu, a town in Longnan, Gansu, China
Pipa, Sichuan, a town in Fushun County, Sichuan, China
Pipa Subdistrict, a subdistrict of Gulou District, Xuzhou, Jiangsu, China
 Pipa Beach, a village and beach in the state of Rio Grande do Norte, Brazil
 Phoenix Islands Protected Area, a marine protected area located in the Republic of Kiribati

Other
 Pípá (枇杷), Mandarin for Loquat, a fruit tree in the family Rosaceae
Agua de pipa, a local term for coconut water in Costa Rica, Panama, and Ecuador
 Pipa (frog), a genus popularly known as Surinam toads
 Participatory impact pathways analysis, a project management approach
 Program on International Policy Attitudes, an American research institution
 PIPA Prize, a contemporary art award from Brazil

See also
 Pipas (disambiguation)
 Pippa (disambiguation)